Richard Alexander (November 19, 1902 – August 9, 1989) was an American film character actor.

Biography 
Born in Dallas, Texas, Alexander appeared in numerous film serials such as Flash Gordon, Zorro Rides Again and films like Babes in Toyland, The Gladiator, as well as a leading role in All Quiet on the Western Front. Although he appeared in countless films, almost all of his appearances were uncredited (see filmography below).

Alexander died at age 86 in Woodland Hills, Los Angeles, California. He is buried in Forest Lawn Memorial Park, Glendale, California.

Filmography

Brown of Harvard (1926) as Football Fan (film debut, uncredited)
Old Ironsides (1926) as Seaman (uncredited)
The Fightin' Comeback (1927) as Red Pollock
The King of Kings (1927) as Roman Soldier (uncredited)
Annie Laurie (1927) as One of the MacDonalds (uncredited)
The Leopard Lady (1928)  as Hector - Lion Tamer
Marlie the Killer (1928) as Sam McKee
Virgin Lips (1928) as Carta
The Mysterious Lady (1928) as General's Aide
The Godless Girl (1928) as Prison Guard
The Cameraman (1928) as The Big Sea Lion (uncredited)
The Docks of New York (1928) as Lou's Sweetheart (uncredited)
The Viking (1928) as Sigurd
The Bride of the Colorado (1928) as Dirk
Sin Sister (1929) - Bob Newton as Trader
Tide of Empire (1929) as Gold Miner with Whip (uncredited)
Rio Rita (1929) as Gonzales (uncredited)
The Lone Star Ranger (1930) as Henchman
City Girl (1930) as Mac
Redemption (1930) as Policeman
All Quiet on the Western Front (1930) as Westhus
Rough Waters (1930) as Little
See America Thirst (1930) as McGann's Henchman
Are You There? (1930) as International Crook
The Sunrise Trail (1931) as Henchman (uncredited)
Dirigible (1931) as Radio Operator (uncredited)
The Front Page (1931) as Jacobi (uncredited)
A Connecticut Yankee (1931) as Sagramor's Knight (uncredited)
Young Donovan's Kid (1931) as Ben Murray
Too Many Cooks (1931) as Minor Role (uncredited)
Shanghaied Love (1931) as Eric
The Hurricane Horseman (1931) as Bull Carter - Henchman
Suicide Fleet (1931) as Crew Member (uncredited)
A House Divided (1931) as Sailor (uncredited)
The Law of the Tong (1931) as Davy Jones
The Sunset Trail (1932) as One-Shot
One Man Law (1932) as Sorenson
Law and Order (1932) as Kurt Northrup
Love Bound (1932) as Larry, the Randolph Chauffeur, posing as J. B. 'Lucky' Morrison
Two-Fisted Law (1932) as Zeke Yokum - Henchman
Heroes of the West (1932) as Frontiersman at Beginning of Each Episode (uncredited)
Daring Danger (1932) as Bull Bagley
The Texas Bad Man (1932) as Gene - Texas Ranger (uncredited)
Skyscraper Souls (1932) as Man Tom Bumps Into (uncredited)
Flaming Gold (1932) as Truck Driver in Cantina (uncredited)
Scarlet Dawn (1932) as Pyotyr (uncredited)
The Sign of the Cross (1932) as Viturius
Sundown Rider (1932) as Posse Leader (uncredited)
Laughter in Hell (1933) as Construction Boss (uncredited)
Below the Sea (1933) as Sailor (uncredited)
Destination Unknown (1933) as Alex
Diplomaniacs (1933) as Bouncer (uncredited)
Roman Scandals (1933) as Valerius' Soldier (uncredited)
Queen Christina (1933) as Peasant in Crowd (uncredited)
The Fighting Code (1933) as Sheriff Olson
Sixteen Fathoms Deep (1934) as Martin, Burly Crewman
George White's Scandals (1934) as Iceman
Voice in the Night (1934) as Lineman Restraining Jackson (uncredited)
The Scarlet Empress (1934) - Count von Breummer (uncredited)
The Law of the Wild (1934, Serial) as Lewis R. Lou Salters [Ch. 1]
Cleopatra (1934) as General Philodemas
We Live Again (1934) as Warden (uncredited)
Kentucky Kernels (1934) as Hank Wakefield
Babes in Toyland (1934) as King's Guard (uncredited)
Cowboy Holiday (1934) as Deputy Walt Gregor
Unconquered Bandit (1935) as Night Hawk Henchman Pat
Romance in Manhattan (1935) as Man at East River (uncredited)
Coyote Trails (1935) as Mack Larkin
Rumba (1935) as Cop (uncredited)
Born to Battle (1935) as Nate
The Cowboy and the Bandit (1935) as Scarface Jennings
The Miracle Rider (1935) as Buffalo Hunter [Ch. 1] (uncredited)
Fighting Shadows (1935) as Bull Maddigan (uncredited)
Men of the Hour (1935) as Police Lieutenant (uncredited)
Riding Wild (1935) as Henchman Ed Barker
She Gets Her Man (1935) as Barton - A Gangster (uncredited)
The Crusades (1935) as Crusading Warrior (uncredited)
The Big Broadcast of 1936 (1935) as Salvo (uncredited)
Freckles (1935) as Butch
Annie Oakley (1935) as Crown Prince Wilhelm (uncredited)
The Fighting Marines (1935, Serial) as Ivan as Henchman [Chs. 1–4, 7-9]
A Tale of Two Cities (1935) as Executioner (uncredited)
Roarin' Guns (1936) as Bull Langdon
Modern Times (1936) as The Prison Cellmate
Dangerous Waters (1936) as Hays
Drift Fence (1936) as Henchman Seth Haverly
Follow the Fleet (1936) as  Paradise Ballroom Waiter (uncredited)
The Story of Louis Pasteur (1936) as Burly Farmer (uncredited)
Silly Billies (1936) as John Little
Flash Gordon (1936, Serial) as Prince Barin [Chs. 5-13]
The Clutching Hand (1936, Serial) as First Mate Olaf [Chs.11-12,14] (uncredited)
Everyman's Law (1936) as Barber
Bengal Tiger (1936) as Strong Man (uncredited)
Wild Brian Kent (1936) as Phil Hansen
The Plainsman (1936) as Lattimer's Third Teamster (uncredited)
Love on the Run (1936) as Wilhelm - Baron's Henchman (uncredited)
Reefer Madness (1936) as Pete Daley - Dope Pusher (uncredited)
Jungle Jim (1937, Serial) as Seaman Crying Man Overboard (chapter one) (uncredited)
Outcast (1937) as Lyncher (uncredited)
Feud of the Trail (1937) as Holcomb Brother
Mystery Range (1937) as Luke Bardos
Two-Fisted Sheriff (1937) as Bull - Henchman (uncredited)
Flying Fists (1937) as Fritz (uncredited)
The Toast of New York (1937) as Stabbed Actor in Play (uncredited)
Think Fast, Mr. Moto (1937) as Ivan - Doorman (uncredited)
The Big Shot (1937) as Gate Guard (uncredited)
SOS Coast Guard (1937) as Thorg
Zorro Rides Again (1937, Serial) as Brad Dace - aka El Lobo
Outlaws of the Prairie (1937) as Rufe Lupton (uncredited)
The Buccaneer (1938) as Pirate (uncredited)
Where the West Begins (1938) as Barnes
Flash Gordon's Trip to Mars (1938, Serial) as Prince Barin [Chs. 6-15]
The Adventures of Marco Polo (1938) as Ahmed's Aide (uncredited)
Joy of Living (1938) as Angry Man in Revolving Door (uncredited)
Six Shootin' Sheriff (1938) as Big Boy - Bar X Rider
Marie Antoinette (1938) as Man with Pike (uncredited)
On the Great White Trail (1938) as Doc Howe
The Gladiator (1938) as Tough Guy (uncredited)
Keep Smiling (1938) as Pete, Grip (uncredited)
The Mysterious Rider (1938) as Big Tom Hudson (uncredited)
Where the Buffalo Roam (1938) as Sellers
The Storm (1938) as Sailor/Brawler (uncredited)
Santa Fe Stampede (1938) as Henchman Joe Moffit (uncredited)
Charlie Chan in Honolulu (1938) as Crewman (uncredited)
Disbarred (1939) as Counterman (uncredited)
Flying G-Men (1939, Serial) as Sam Blaine (uncredited)
Union Pacific (1939) as Card Player (uncredited)
Chasing Danger (1939) as Warrior (uncredited)
They Asked for It (1939) as Mollens (uncredited)
Captain Fury (1939) as Guard
Frontier Marshal (1939) as Curly Bill's Henchman (uncredited)
The Kansas Terrors (1939) as Nico
Tower of London (1939) as 2nd Gate Guard Greeting Tom Clink (uncredited)
Destry Rides Again (1939) as Cowboy (uncredited)
Death Rides the Range (1939) as Big Nick Harden (uncredited)
Boss of Bullion City (1940) as Steve Hogan
Strange Cargo (1940) as Guard (uncredited)
Dark Command (1940) as Phil - Guerrilla Guarding Seton (uncredited)
Covered Wagon Days (1940) as Border Guard (uncredited)
Son of Roaring Dan (1940) as Big Taylor
Wyoming (1940) as Gus - Henchman (uncredited)
Rangers of Fortune (1940) as Water Thug (uncredited)
The Great Dictator (1940) as Tomainian Prison Guard in 1918 (uncredited)
The Lady from Cheyenne (1941) as Henchman (uncredited)
In the Navy (1941) as Big Bruiser (uncredited)
Broadway Limited (1941) as Would-Be Kidnapper (uncredited)
Riders of Death Valley (1941, Serial) as Henchman Pete Grump
Wild Geese Calling (1941) as Alaskan (uncredited)
The Iron Claw (1941, Serial) as Henchman (uncredited)
Man from Montana (1941) as Henchman Kohler
Badlands of Dakota (1941) as Poker Player Who Challenges Jim (uncredited)
Burma Convoy (1941) as Truck Driver in Bar (uncredited)
Never Give a Sucker an Even Break (1941) as Burly Man (uncredited)
Sea Raiders (1941, Serial) as Jenkins
Double Trouble (1941) as Seaman
The Corsican Brothers (1941) as Castle Guard (uncredited)
Paris Calling (1941) as German Guard (uncredited)
Code of the Outlaw (1942) as Horse Buyer (uncredited)
The Ghost of Frankenstein (1942) as Villager (uncredited)
Reap the Wild Wind (1942) as Stoker Boss (uncredited)
Raiders of the Range (1942) as Bull - Saloon Brawler (uncredited)
Romance on the Range (1942) as Henchman (uncredited)
In Old California (1942) as Clem - Dawson's Henchman (uncredited)
Lady in a Jam (1942) as Fighter - Long White Beard (uncredited)
Hangmen Also Die! (1943) as Slugger in Theater (uncredited)
King of the Cowboys (1943) as Joe - Prop Man (uncredited)
Du Barry Was a Lady (1943) as Marching Rebel Behind King Louis (uncredited)
The Return of the Rangers (1943) as Henchman Sam Kane (uncredited)
The Chance of a Lifetime (1943) as Carpet Man (uncredited)
Is Everybody Happy? (1943) as Audience Member Punching Jerry (uncredited)
Klondike Kate (1943) as Bill (uncredited)
Ali Baba and the Forty Thieves (1944) as Mongol Guard (uncredited)
Raiders of the Border (1944) as Steve Rollins - Henchman
Oklahoma Raiders (1944) as Henchman Duggan
Call of the South Seas (1944) as Bailey
Boss of Boomtown (1944) as The Yuma Kid
Spook Town (1944) as Henchman
Man from Frisco (1944) as Workman (uncredited)
Trigger Trail (1944) as Henchman Waco
Raiders of Ghost City (1944, Serial) as Henchman (uncredited)
Three Little Sisters (1944) as Charlie Nichols (uncredited)
Gunsmoke Mesa (1944) as Henchman Lear
Storm Over Lisbon (1944) as Doorman (uncredited)
Riders of the Santa Fe (1944) as Biff McCauley - Henchman
Lost in a Harem (1944) as Executioner (uncredited)
The Princess and the Pirate (1944) as Holdup Thug (uncredited)
Can't Help Singing (1944) as Pioneer (uncredited)
I Was a Criminal (1945) as 1st Passport Official
His Brother's Ghost (1945) as Henchman (uncredited)
The House of Fear (1945) as Ralph King (uncredited)
Salome, Where She Danced (1945) as Shotgun (uncredited)
The Master Key (1945, Serial) as Flamingo Club Bouncer (uncredited)
Renegades of the Rio Grande (1945) as Pete Jackson - Henchman
Boston Blackie's Rendezvous (1945) as 1st Bruiser (uncredited)
Riders of the Dawn (1945) as Thorpe - Blacksmith (uncredited)
Abbott and Costello in Hollywood (1945) as Eddie (uncredited)
Senorita from the West (1945) as Masseur (uncredited)
Flaming Bullets (1945) as Dick (uncredited)
The Royal Mounted Rides Again (1945, Serial) as Blackie LaRock (uncredited)
The Daltons Ride Again (1945) as Henchman (uncredited)
The Fighting Guardsman (1946) as Bearded Man (uncredited)
Night in Paradise (1946) as Temple Guard (uncredited)
Canyon Passage (1946) as Miner (uncredited)
Spook Busters (1946) as Ivan
Neath Canadian Skies (1946) as Pete Davis
North of the Border (1946) as Tiny Muller
Song of Scheherazade (1947) as Theater Attendant (uncredited)
Northwest Outpost (1947) as Large Convict (uncredited)
The Marauders (1947) as Henchman Smitty (uncredited)
Jesse James Rides Again (1947, Serial) as Clem (uncredited)
Heaven Only Knows (1947) as One of Byron's Gunmen (uncredited)
Unconquered (1947) as Slave (uncredited)
The Wild Frontier (1947) as Bartender (uncredited)
Louisiana (1947) as Blacksmith
Arch of Triumph (1948) as Gestapo Agent (uncredited)
Silent Conflict (1948) as 1st. Rancher
The Dead Don't Dream (1948) as Duke - Handyman
Silver River (1948) as Sweeney Henchman (uncredited)
A Southern Yankee (1948) as Bartender (uncredited)
Two Guys from Texas (1948) as Dick (uncredited)
False Paradise (1948) as Sam - Henchman
Joan of Arc (1948) as Man on Boulevard (uncredited)
Loaded Pistols (1948) as Big Balding Man at Dance (uncredited)
The Life of Riley (1949) as Cheerful Finance Company Bouncer (uncredited)
Rimfire (1949) as Karl Weber
Big Jack (1949) as Bandit (uncredited)
Canadian Pacific (1949) as Railroad Worker (uncredited)
Hellfire (1949) as Blacksmith (uncredited)
Lust for Gold (1949) as Townsman (uncredited)
The Fighting Kentuckian (1949) s Militiaman (uncredited)
Copper Canyon (1950) as Excited Townsman (uncredited)
Cargo to Capetown (1950) as Deck Crewman (uncredited)
Rock Island Trail (1950) as Morrow's Henchman (uncredited)
Father of the Bride (1950) as Moving Man with Screen (uncredited)
Across the Badlands (1950) as Burly Tough Guy
One Too Many (1950) as Truck Driver Drinking Coca-Cola in Bar
Inside Straight (1951) as Asst. Foreman (uncredited)
The Scarf (1951) as Barfly (uncredited)
Silver Canyon (1951) as Henchman Luke Anders
Cyclone Fury (1951) as Henchman in Johnny's Hotel Room (uncredited)
Meet Danny Wilson (1952) as Nightclub Patron (uncredited)
Night Stage to Galveston (1952) as Patrol Headquarters Leader (uncredited)
Montana Territory (1952) as Buzzard (uncredited)
I Dream of Jeanie (1952) as Cop (uncredited)
Woman of the North Country (1952) as Townsman (uncredited)
Woman They Almost Lynched (1953) as Townsman (uncredited)
A Perilous Journey (1953) as Crying Miner (uncredited)
South Sea Woman (1953) as Bouncer at Krastner's (uncredited)
Dangerous When Wet (1953) as Egyptian Channel swimmer
Pack Train (1953) as Bartender-Charlie (uncredited)
The Band Wagon (1953) as Stagehand (uncredited)
The Mississippi Gambler (1953) as Townsman (uncredited)
Those Redheads from Seattle (1953) as Barfly (uncredited)
So Big (1953) as Bidder (uncredited)
Trader Tom of the China Seas (1954) as Gorth (uncredited)
The Long, Long Trailer (1954) as Bald Shopper in Bungalette Trailer (uncredited)
Broken Lance (1954) as Extra Outside Courtroom (uncredited)
The Bounty Hunter (1954) as Gambler (uncredited)
Timberjack (1955) as Barfly (uncredited)
The Road to Denver (1955) as Bartender #2 (uncredited)
King of the Carnival (1955, Serial) as Tent Worker 2 (uncredited)
The Spoilers (1955) as Miner (uncredited)
Flesh and the Spur (1956) as Bartender (uncredited)
Hollywood or Bust (1956) as Western Actor (uncredited)
The Buster Keaton Story (1957) as Tough Guy (uncredited)
The Night the World Exploded (1957) as Workman (uncredited)
Les Girls (1957) as Stagehand (uncredited)
Day of the Badman (1958) as Townsman (uncredited)
Cole Younger, Gunfighter (1958) as Barfly (uncredited)
The Sheepman (1958) as Barfly (uncredited)
Buchanan Rides Alone (1958) as Barfly (uncredited)
The Big Country (1958) as Party Guest (uncredited)
The Last Hurrah (1958) as Mourner Given Cigar at Wake (uncredited)
Alias Jesse James (1959) as Jeremiah Cole (uncredited)
The Young Land (1959) as Juror (uncredited)
Ada (1961) as Member of the State Legislature (uncredited)
The Gun Hawk (1963) as Barfly (uncredited)
36 Hours (1965) as Man Paying Respects (uncredited)
Requiem for a Gunfighter (1965) as Trial Spectator (uncredited)
The Great Race (1965) as Barfly (uncredited)
The Bounty Killer (1965) as Townsman (uncredited)
A Big Hand for the Little Lady (1966) as Barfly (uncredited)
The Cheyenne Social Club (1970) as Barfly (uncredited) (final film role)

Television

 Dick Tracy (1950) as Angel
 The Lone Ranger (1950-1953) as Jed / Hogjaw / Meeker
 Adventures of Wild Bill Hickok (1952) as Luke Barstow
 Death Valley Days (1952-1955) as Jim Byro / Dusty
 The Life and Legend of Wyatt Earp (1956) as Crummy Newton
 Annie Oakley (1956) as George Todd
 Tombstone Territory (1957) as Townsman
 The Deputy (1959) as Bartender / Barfly
 Gunsmoke (1960) as Trial Spectator
 The Rifleman (1960) as Blacksmith / Nels Swenson / Nils Swenson
 Wanted: Dead or Alive (1961) as Nels Svenson
 Whispering Smith (1961) as Barfly / Townsman
 The Dakotas (1963) as Miner
 Bonanza (1963) as Trial Spectator
 McHale's Navy (1965) as Gambler
 Pistols 'n' Petticoats (1966) as Church Member

References

External links

 
 

1902 births
1989 deaths
20th-century American male actors
American male film actors
Male actors from Dallas
Burials at Forest Lawn Memorial Park (Glendale)
Male Western (genre) film actors
Golden Boot Awards recipients